Steven Van Knotsenburg (born February 21, 1982) is a Canadian rower from Beamsville, Ontario. Van Knotsenburg had his greatest success when he won a silver at the 2009 World Rowing Championships in the men's eight. At the 2011 Pan American Games he won two medals a silver and a bronze in the men's eight and coxless pairs respectively, with Pete McCleelan.

References

External links
Profile at Rowing Canada

1982 births
Living people
Rowers from Ontario
Canadian male rowers
Rowers at the 2011 Pan American Games
World Rowing Championships medalists for Canada
Pan American Games silver medalists for Canada
Pan American Games bronze medalists for Canada
Pan American Games medalists in rowing
Medalists at the 2011 Pan American Games